Hugo Cumbo (born 11 May 1996) is a judoka from Vanuatu. He competed at the 2020 Summer Olympics in the Men's 81 kg.

Personal life
He graduated with a masters degree from Arts et Métiers and the University of Guadalajara in industrial engineering.

References

External links
 

Living people
1996 births
Vanuatuan male judoka
Olympic judoka of Vanuatu
Judoka at the 2020 Summer Olympics
Arts et Métiers ParisTech alumni
University of Guadalajara alumni